Cuneifrons is a monotypic moth genus of the family Crambidae described by Eugene G. Munroe in 1961. Its only species, Cuneifrons coloradensis, described by the same author in the same year, is found in the US state of Colorado.

References

Odontiinae
Monotypic moth genera
Crambidae genera
Taxa named by Eugene G. Munroe